Badminton competitions for the East Asian Games were held in the years 1993, 1997, 2009 and 2013.

Venues

Winners

Medal table

External links
http://www.tournamentsoftware.com/sport/events.aspx?id=EB830828-A41C-4549-B661-2AB60E2862DD
http://www.worldbadminton.com/shuttlenws/19970518.html
http://www.tournamentsoftware.com/sport/events.aspx?id=11FC3D0F-DED0-4C32-80D7-72833082FABE
East Asian Games Badminton Schedule & Results

East Asian Games
Badminton at the East Asian Games
Recurring sporting events established in 1993
East Asian Games